Amanda Palmer Goes Down Under is the first live album by Amanda Palmer, released on January 21, 2011, through Liberator Music in Australia and New Zealand and self-released worldwide via Palmer's Bandcamp and through her merchandise company Post-War Trade. It contains live performances of Palmer's performances in Australia, as well as studio recordings of the album's three singles "Map of Tasmania", "On an Unknown Beach", and "In My Mind". The album has an Antipodean theme and features songs Palmer wrote about, or while in, Australia and New Zealand, throughout her early 2010 Australasian tour.

The first single "Map of Tasmania" featuring The Young Punx, was released on Palmer's Bandcamp music website. The song's music video, directed by Michael Pope, premiered on Spin's website on January 13, 2011. A remix of the song was also created, including an altered music video featuring a cameo from Canadian electronic musician Peaches.

On January 30, 2011, the album debuted at No. 25 on the Australian ARIA Albums Chart.

The song "In My Mind" was featured in the soundtrack of the 2015 game Life Is Strange.

Reception

The album has received a score of 74/100 on media aggregate site Metacritic indicating "generally favorable reviews." Simon Price of The Independent called the album "touching, witty, and like everything else the Bostonian ever does, brilliant" Kyle Ryan of The A.V. Club reviewed the album positively, saying "But the album’s best moments happen when Palmer settles down and plays by herself, like on “On An Unknown Beach” or “Australia,” or her cover of Nick Cave’s “The Ship Song,” which closes the breezy album with a quietly devastating reminder of Palmer’s considerable talent."

Track listing

References

External links
 
  on Bandcamp

2011 live albums
Live albums by American artists
Amanda Palmer albums
Albums recorded at the Sydney Opera House
Live alternative rock albums